North Slope can refer to:

 Alaska North Slope, a region encompassing the northernmost part of the U.S. state of Alaska
 North Slope Borough, Alaska, a borough in Alaska whose boundaries roughly coincide with that of the region
 North Slope, Tacoma, Washington, a neighborhood
 North Slope, an Inupiaq language dialect
 Alaska gas pipeline, also known as the North Slope Gas Pipeline
 Dalton Highway, also known as the North Slope Haul Road
 Prudhoe Bay Oil Field, colloquially known as "the North Slope" to many who work and visit there